Patagiomyia is a genus of flies in the family Stratiomyidae.

Species
Patagiomyia cyphomyioides Lindner, 1933

Distribution
Colombia, Peru, Ecuador, Bolivia.

References

Stratiomyidae
Brachycera genera
Taxa named by Erwin Lindner
Diptera of South America